ASTA Linhas Aéreas is a domestic airline based in Cuiabá, Brazil. Founded in 2009, it operates regular charter flights.

History
ASTA (América do Sul Táxi Aéreo Ltda) exists since 1995 as an air taxi company but on December 29, 2009, the company received authorization to operate regular flights albeit still under charter status.

On August 22, 2019, ASTA signed an interline agreement with Azul Brazilian Airlines. According to this agreement ASTA provides feeder services to Azul flights to and from the base at Cuiabá. This agreement was later terminated because Azul started operating feeder services via its subsidiary Azul Conecta.

On April 8, 2021, ASTA decided to suspend indefinitely all regular flights albeit retaining the AOC for such flights. The company continues to operate as an air taxi company.

Destinations

Fleet
As of July 2015 the fleet of ASTA Linhas Aéreas included the following aircraft:

Airline affinity program
ASTA Linhas Aéreas has no frequent-flyer program.

See also
List of airlines of Brazil

References

External links

Airlines of Brazil
Airlines established in 2009